These are the late night schedules for the four United States broadcast networks that offer programming during this time period, from September 1997 to August 1998. All times are Eastern or Pacific. Affiliates will fill non-network schedule with local, syndicated, or paid programming. Affiliates also have the option to preempt or delay network programming at their discretion.

Legend

Schedule

Monday-Friday

Saturday

By network

ABC

Returning series
ABC in Concert
ABC World News Now
ABC World News This Morning
Nightline
Politically Incorrect with Bill Maher

CBS

Returning series
CBS Morning News
Late Show with David Letterman
The Late Late Show with Tom Snyder
Up to the Minute

Fox

Returning series
MADtv

NBC

Returning series
Friday Night
Late Night with Conan O'Brien
Later
NBC News at Sunrise
NBC Nightside
Saturday Night Live
The Tonight Show with Jay Leno

United States late night network television schedules
1997 in American television
1998 in American television